"Liberation" is a song by English synth-pop duo Pet Shop Boys, released as the fourth single from their fifth studio album, Very (1993). It peaked at number 14 on the UK Singles Chart, making it the lowest-charting single from Very in the United Kingdom. The single's B-side, "Decadence", featuring Pat O'Brien was on the Further Listening: 1992–1994 re-release of Very, and the B-sides compilation Alternative.

Critical reception
In his weekly UK chart commentary, James Masterton wrote, "The single makes a strong showing, not least due to the fact that the gorgeous ballad is one of the best tracks from the album. What gives it an extra boost is the innovating virtual reality video, currently touring the country in a roadshow whereby punters can climb into a booth and experience the state of the art computer graphics at first hand. Even the standard 2D version is a wonder to behold, whatever happens to the single it is surely a candidate for video of the year." Alan Jones from Music Week rated the song four out of five, naming it Pick of the Week. He commented, "Sleek and sophisticated in its original mix, expensive strings underscore Neil Tennant's typically mournful vocals. [...] The fourth hit from the PSBs album Very, and a big one." 

Mark Sutherland from Smash Hits also gave it four out of five, writing, "This is not the Pettoes at the absolute pinnacle of their powers, but "Liberation" still has more than enough going for it to merit mass swooning. [...] This is a touchingly tender tinkle through an achingly sad song, with Neil's vocals at their very wispiest, so may I suggest a smart top hat and tails, in day-glo lilac with matching feather dusters. The song's absolutely marvellous, by the way." Jonathan Bernstein from Spin remarked its "sigh of surrender".

Music video
The accompanying music video for the song, directed by Howard Greenhalgh, is almost entirely CG, an early example of exclusively CG output. The only live-action footage the video features is Neil Tennant's face, seen singing on gold circles. Other features in the video are reminiscent of the duo, including several disembodied heads wearing tall pointy caps (like those seen in the video for "Can You Forgive Her?") and animated versions of the object on the cover, a 3D rendering of Neil and Chris's silhouettes. The video was used as part of CyberWorld, an early 3D cinema demonstration, on IMAX screens across the UK and elsewhere in 2000 and 2001.

Track listings

 UK and Australian CD1
 "Liberation"
 "Decadence"
 "Liberation" (E Smoove mix)
 "Liberation" (E Smoove 7-inch edit)

 UK and Australian CD2
 "Liberation" (Murk Deepstrumental mix)
 "Liberation" (Oscar G's Dopeassdub mix)
 "Young Offender" (Jam & Spoon Trip-o-Matic Fairy Tale mix)
 "Decadence" (unplugged mix)

 UK 7-inch and cassette single; European CD single
 "Liberation" – 4:06
 "Decadence" – 3:55

 UK 2×12-inch single
A1. "Liberation" (E Smoove 7-inch edit)
B1. "Liberation" (Murk Deepstrumental mix)
B2. "Liberation" (Oscar G's Dopeassdub mix)
B3. "Liberation" (Murk dirty club mix)
C1. "Young Offender" (Jam & Spoon Trip-o-Matic Fairy Tale mix)
D1. "Young Offender" (Remix No 2)

Charts

References

1993 songs
1994 singles
Music videos directed by Howard Greenhalgh
Parlophone singles
Pet Shop Boys songs
Songs written by Chris Lowe
Songs written by Neil Tennant